Charny-Orée-de-Puisaye is a commune in the Yonne department of central France, on the Northern end of the historical region of Puisaye. The municipality was established on 1 January 2016 by merger of the former communes of Charny, Chambeugle, Chêne-Arnoult, Chevillon, Dicy, Fontenouilles, Grandchamp, Malicorne, Marchais-Beton, Perreux, Prunoy, Saint-Denis-sur-Ouanne, Saint-Martin-sur-Ouanne and Villefranche.

See also 
Communes of the Yonne department

References 

Communes of Yonne